Piala Presiden may refer to one of two football competitions:

 The Piala Presiden (Malaysia)
 The Indonesia President's Cup